Cortinarius bovarius is an agaric fungus in the family Cortinariaceae. Described as new to science in 2013, it is found in western North America. The specific epithet bovarius refers to the similarity to the European lookalike Cortinarius bovinus.

Description
The gills are moderately distantly spaced, with an adnexed to emarginate attachment to the stipe. The spores measure 8.5–10 by 5.5–6–6.5 μm. The basidia (spore-bearing cells) are four-spored, and measure 30–40 by 7.5–9.5 μm.

Habitat and distribution
Cortinarius bovarius is found in western North America, including Alaska, and Alberta (Canada). It grows in coniferous forests dominated by spruce trees, and prefers rich, calcareous soils. Fruiting occurs from late August to September.

See also
List of Cortinarius species

References

External links
 

bovarius
Fungi of North America
Fungi described in 2013